Zhenis Kakenuly Nurlybayev (Jeńis Kákenuly Nurlybaev; born ) is a Kazakh painter, art critic and author of the сulture support Year emblem in Kazakhstan (2000), laureate of The presidential grant of The Republic of Kazakhstan  (2010).

Life and career 
Nurlybayev was born in Karabulak (Almaty Region, Kazakhstan). He dreamed to be an artist at childhood. At school ages Zhenis's favourite subject was a painting . In 1982 he graduated Zhalanash high school with distinction.

1982-1989 he studied at the art-graphic faculty of the Kazakh Pedagogical Institute in Almaty (now Abay Kazakh National Pedagogical University).
1983-1985 he served in the army of Soviet Union.
1989 he worked as the art illustrator of «Ak Zhelken» journal (Almaty).
1990—1991 — art editor of «Zerde» journal (Almaty).
1991—1993 — artist of «Madeniet» magazine (Almaty).
1994—2008 — artist of «Tura Bi» magazine (Almaty, Astana)

Сreativity 

Zhenis Kakenuly is a versatile artist: he works in the painting, graphics, computer graphics, caricature fields.

Personal exhibitions:
Personal exhibition in the President Culture Center. 23 April 2003, Astana.
Personal exhibition in the Abilkhan Kasteyev State Art Museum . 10 December 2005, Astana.
Personal exhibition in the Museum Of Modern Art. 22 December 2006, Astana.
Personal exhibition in the school-lycée № 53 . 16 November 2007, Astana.
Personal exhibition in the «Kulanshi» art gallery. 15 April 2009, Astana.
«The Quintessence» personal exhibition in the National State Library Of Kazakhstan. 16 November 2010, Astana.

Joint exhibitions:
«The smell of wormwood. Fine art works exhibition of Kazakhstan painters devoted th the Independency day of the Republic of Kazakhstan». December 2009, New York City.
«DER GERUCH VON WERMUT — Zeitgenössische Kunst aus Kasachstan». 18 November 2009, Berlin.
TURKSOY. 3 June 2009. Amasya
«The smell of wormwood». 2 November 2009. «Kulanshi» art gallery, Astana.

References

External links 
The Official Web-site of Zhenis Kakenuly Nurlybayev
The videochannel of Zhenis Kakenuly Nurlybayev on YouTube.com 

1965 births
Living people
Kazakhstani painters
People from Almaty Region
20th-century Kazakhstani painters
21st-century Kazakhstani painters